The Roman Catholic Diocese of Hazaribag is a diocese located in the city of Hazaribag in the Ecclesiastical province of Ranchi in India.

History
 April 1, 1995: Established as Diocese of Hazaribag from the Diocese of Daltonganj

Leadership
 Bishops of Hazaribag (Latin Church)
 Bishop Charles Soreng, S.J. (April 1, 1995 – September 8, 2012)
 Bishop Jojo Anand (Appointed September 8, 2012 – present)

References

External links
 GCatholic.org 
 Catholic Hierarchy 

Roman Catholic dioceses in India
Christian organizations established in 1995
Roman Catholic dioceses and prelatures established in the 20th century
1995 establishments in Bihar
Christianity in Jharkhand
Hazaribagh